Bhaskar Vira is an Indian academic, professor of Political Economy, and the current Pro Vice Chancellor for Education for Cambridge University. From 2019 until 2022 he was Head of Department of Geography, University of Cambridge. He was the founding director of the University of Cambridge Conservation Research Institute, and is a fellow of Fitzwilliam College, Cambridge. In 2018, he was awarded the Busk Medal by the Royal Geographical Society for his contributions in the fields of environment, development and economy. In 2021, he was elected to a Fellowship of the Academy of Social Sciences for his contributions to social science.

Biography
Vira was born in New Delhi, India and was educated at The Doon School in Dehradun. After Doon, he went to St. Stephen's College, Delhi for a bachelor's degree in economics and then got a second BA from St. John's College, Cambridge. He then stayed in Cambridge to pursue an MPhil and a PhD in economics and political economy respectively.

Career
While working on his doctorate, Vira lectured at St. John's College, Cambridge in 1993–94. After receiving his doctorate in 1994, Vira became a Research Fellow at the Oxford Centre for Environment, Ethics and Society in Mansfield College, University of Oxford, and remained there till 1997. He then joined the Department of Geography at the University of Cambridge and became a fellow and graduate tutor at Fitzwilliam College, Cambridge. In 2013, he became the founding director of the University of Cambridge Conservation Research Institute. He was appointed Head of Department of Geography, University of Cambridge in October 2019. He regularly writes for various newspapers and magazines, including The Guardian, The Independent, Quartz, and The Wire. He was awarded the Busk Medal by Royal Geographical Society in 2018, for his interdisciplinary contributions in the fields of environment, development and economy. In 2021, he was elected to a Fellowship of the Academy of Social Sciences for his contributions to social science.

Selected publications

References

External links
Bhaskar Vira at Google Scholar
Bhaskar Vira profile at the University of Cambridge
Bhaskar Vira - The Guardian
Profile - World Economic Forum

Living people
1968 births
Department of Geography, University of Cambridge
Fellows of Fitzwilliam College, Cambridge
Alumni of the University of Cambridge
Alumni of St John's College, Cambridge
St. Stephen's College, Delhi alumni
Delhi University alumni
The Doon School alumni
Fellows of Mansfield College, Oxford
English geographers
Economic geographers
Professors of Political Economy (Cambridge)